In computing, a secure environment is any system which implements the controlled storage and use of information.  In the event of computing data loss, a secure environment is used to protect personal or confidential data.

Often, secure environments employ cryptography as a means to protect information.

Some secure environments employ cryptographic hashing, simply to verify that the information has not been altered since it was last modified.

See also
 Data recovery
 Cleanroom
 Mandatory access control (MAC)
 Trusted computing
 Homomorphic encryption

Computer security